Major-General Sir James Campbell  (1761 – 23 January 1840) was a Royal Marines officer who served as Deputy Adjutant-General Royal Marines.

Military career
Campbell was commissioned into the Royal Marines in 1776. He became a major and field officer at the Chatham Division in April 1802 and went on to be lieutenant colonel at the Portsmouth Division in November 1808. Promoted to major-general on 27 May 1825, he became Deputy Adjutant-General Royal Marines (the professional head of the Royal Marines) in August 1825 before retiring in March 1831.

References

Sources
 
 

 

1761 births
1840 deaths
Royal Marines generals
Knights Bachelor